Francis Perron (born April 18, 1996) is a Canadian professional ice hockey forward who is currently playing for the Swedish HockeyAllsvenskan team IF Björklöven. Perron was selected by the Ottawa Senators in the seventh round, 190th overall, in the 2014 NHL Entry Draft.

Playing career
Perron played major junior hockey with the Rouyn-Noranda Huskies of the Quebec Major Junior Hockey League. In his final junior season in 2015–16, Perron led the Huskies as team captain with 41 goals and 108 points in just 62 regular-season games. He was signed prior to the playoffs to a three-year entry-level contract with his draft club, the Ottawa Senators, on March 15, 2016.

He continued his scoring dominance in the post-season, helping the Huskies claim the QMJHL championship with 33 points in 18 contests to earn the Guy Lafleur Trophy as playoff MVP and the Michel Brière Memorial Trophy as the league's MVP. In completing his junior career as runners-up in the 2016 Memorial Cup, Perron placed third in all-time scoring for the Rouyn-Noranda Huskies with 257 points, behind Jerome Tremblay and Mike Ribeiro.

On September 13, 2018, Perron was included in the blockbuster trade that saw himself and Erik Karlsson shipped off to the San Jose Sharks. In the 2018–19 season, Perron was assigned by the Sharks to the AHL, joining the San Jose Barracuda. He recorded a career-high in all offensive categories posting 18 goals, 29 assists for 47 points in 63 games for the Barracuda.

At the 2019 NHL Entry Draft, on June 22, 2019, Perron was traded along with a seventh-round pick to the Vancouver Canucks in exchange for a sixth-round selection and the rights to Tom Pyatt. On July 8, 2019, Perron signed a one-year, two-way contract with the Canucks for the 2019–20 season.

When the 2020–21 NHL season began on January 13, 2021, Perron was without a contract. One week later, on January 20, 2021, he signed a one-year contract with IF Björklöven of the HockeyAllsvenskan league.

On June 3rd, 2021, Perron signed a one year extension with IF Björklöven.

Career statistics

Regular season and playoffs

International

Awards and honors

References

External links

1996 births
Living people
Belleville Senators players
Binghamton Senators players
Canadian expatriate ice hockey players in the United States
Canadian ice hockey left wingers
Ottawa Senators draft picks
Rouyn-Noranda Huskies players
Sportspeople from Laval, Quebec
San Jose Barracuda players
Utica Comets players